Yazıören may refer to:

 Yazıören, Bayramören
 Yazıören, Bolu
 Yazıören, Tercan